Typhina clarki is a species of sea snail, a marine gastropod mollusk in the family Muricidae, the murex snails or rock snails.

Description

Distribution
This marine species occurs in Panama Bay.

References

 Houart, R, Buge, B. & Zuccon, D. (2021). A taxonomic update of the Typhinae (Gastropoda: Muricidae) with a review of New Caledonia species and the description of new species from New Caledonia, the South China Sea and Western Australia. Journal of Conchology. 44(2): 103–147.

External links
 
 Keen A.M. & Campbell G.B. (1964). Ten new species of Typhinae (Gastropoda: Muricidae). The Veliger. 7(1): 46-57, 4 pls.

Typhina
Gastropods described in 1964